Porgy & Bess is an album by American jazz guitarist Mundell Lowe and his All Stars featuring their interpretations of the George Gershwin folk opera Porgy and Bess recorded in 1958 for the RCA Camden label.

Reception

Allmusic awarded the album 4 stars with its review by Scott Yanow stating, "Lowe's arrangements are colorful and swinging, doing justice to the music while turning the familiar themes into jazz".

Track listing
All compositions by George Gershwin  
 "Summertime" - 4:46
 "Bess, You Is My Woman Now" - 3:05 
 "I Loves You, Porgy" - 4:57 
 "I Got Plenty O' Nuttin'" - 2:50 
 "Oh Bess, Oh Where's My Bess?" - 2:18 
 "Red Headed Woman" - 2:22 
 "My Man's Gone Now" - 3:24 
 "It Takes a Long Pull to Get There" - 2:46 
 "It Ain't Necessarily So" - 3:11 
 "There's a Boat Dat's Leavin' Soon for New York" - 3:10

Personnel 
Mundell Lowe - guitar  
Art Farmer - trumpet (tracks 1, 2, 4 & 6-9)
Don Elliott - mellophone, vibraphone (tracks 1, 2, 4 & 6-9)
Tony Scott - clarinet, baritone saxophone (tracks 1, 2, 4 & 6-9)
Ben Webster - tenor saxophone (tracks 1, 2, 4 & 6-9)
George Duvivier - bass
Osie Johnson - drums (tracks 1, 2, 4 & 6-9)
Ed Shaughnessy - drums, vibraphone (tracks 3, 5 & 10)

References 

1958 albums
Mundell Lowe albums
RCA Camden Records albums
Mundell Lowe